The governor of Connecticut is the head of government of Connecticut, and the commander-in-chief of the state's military forces. The governor has a duty to enforce state laws, and the power to either approve or veto bills passed by the Connecticut General Assembly and to convene the legislature. Unusual among governors, the Governor of Connecticut has no power to pardon. The Governor of Connecticut is automatically a member of the state's Bonding Commission.  He is an ex-officio member of the board of trustees of the University of Connecticut and Yale University.

There have been 69 post-Revolution governors of the state, serving 73 distinct spans in office. Four have served non-consecutive terms: Henry W. Edwards, James E. English, Marshall Jewell, and Raymond E. Baldwin. The longest terms in office were in the state's early years, when four governors were elected to nine or more one-year terms. The longest was that of the first governor, Jonathan Trumbull, who served over 14 years, but 7 of those as colonial governor; the longest-serving state governor — with no other position included in the term — was his son, Jonathan Trumbull Jr., who served over 11 years. The shortest term was that of Hiram Bingham III, who served only one day before resigning to take an elected seat in the United States Senate. Additionally, Lowell Weicker is noted for a rare third party win in American politics, having been elected to a term in 1990 representing A Connecticut Party.

The current governor is Ned Lamont, a Democrat who took office on January 9, 2019.

Governors 

Connecticut was one of the original Thirteen Colonies and was admitted as a state on January 9, 1788. Before it declared its independence, Connecticut was a colony of the Kingdom of Great Britain.

Connecticut did not create a state constitution for itself until several decades after it became a state; until 1818, the state operated under the provisions of its colonial charter. The charter called for the election of a governor every year, but not more than once every two years, with the term commencing on the second Thursday in May.

The current Constitution of Connecticut, ratified in 1965, calls for a four-year term for the governor, commencing on the Wednesday after the first Monday in the January following an election. The previous constitution of 1818 originally had only a one-year term for governor; this was increased to two years in 1875, and four years in 1948. The 1875 amendment also set the start date of the term to its current date; before then, it was the first Wednesday in the May following an election. The constitution provides for the election of a lieutenant governor for the same term as the governor. The two offices are elected on the same ticket; this provision was added in 1962. In the event of a vacancy in the office of governor, the lieutenant governor becomes governor. Before the adoption of the 1965 constitution, the lieutenant governor only acted as governor. There is no limit of any kind on the number of terms one may serve.

See also
Gubernatorial lines of succession in the United States#Connecticut

Notes

References
General

 
 
 
 

Constitutions

 
 
 

Specific

External links

 Office of the Governor of Connecticut

Lists of state governors of the United States
 
Governors